Balesin can refer to the following places:

 Balesin, Meyaneh, village in Iran
 Balesin-e Sharifabad, village in Iran
 Balesin Island (also just Balesin), island barangay in the Philippines
 Balesin Airport, airport serving the Island of Balesin, Philippines